The 2012–13 season was the 98th season of the Isthmian League, which is an English football competition featuring semi-professional and amateur clubs from London, East and South East England.

The constitution of the three divisions was announced on 25 May 2012. For this season, only two clubs were relegated from the Premier Division, and one from each Division One. This was to allow for expansion to 72 clubs for the 2013–14 season.

Premier Division

The Premier Division consisted of 22 clubs, including 16 clubs from the previous season, and six new clubs:
 Bognor Regis Town, promoted as play-off winners in Division One South
 Enfield Town, promoted as play-off winners in Division One North
 Hampton & Richmond Borough, relegated from the Conference South
 Leiston, promoted as champions of Division One North
 Thurrock, relegated from the Conference South
 Whitehawk, promoted as champions of Division One South

Whitehawk won the division to earn a second consecutive title and were promoted to the Conference South along with play-off winners Concord Rangers. Due to league expansion there were only two relegation places this season. Initially, Carshalton Athletic and Hastings United were relegated, but Thurrock were subsequently deducted three points for fielding a suspended player on the second day of the season. It sent Thurrock bottom of the table and they were relegated for a second consecutive season. A subsequent appeal was rejected. This allowed for an effective reprieve for Carshalton Athletic.

League table

Top scorers

Play-offs

Semi-finals

Final

Results grid

Stadia and locations

Division One North

Division One North consisted of 22 clubs, including 19 clubs from the previous season, and three new clubs:
 Aveley, relegated from the Premier Division
 Witham Town, promoted as champions of the Essex Senior League
 Wroxham, promoted as champions of the Eastern Counties League

Grays Athletic won the division and were promoted to the Premier Division along with play-off winners Thamesmead Town. Due to league expansion, there was only one relegation place this season. Ilford finished bottom of the table and were relegated from the division after seven seasons.

League table

Top scorers

Play-offs

Semi-finals

Final

Results grid

Stadia and locations

Division One South

Division One South consisted of 22 clubs, including 17 clubs from the previous season, and five new clubs:
 Herne Bay, promoted as champions of the Kent League
 Horsham, relegated from the Premier Division
 Leatherhead, relegated from the Premier Division
 Three Bridges, promoted as champions of the Sussex County League
 Tooting & Mitcham United, relegated from the Premier Division
Crawley Down F.C. changed their name to Crawley Down Gatwick F.C.

Dulwich Hamlet won the division and were promoted to the Premier Division along with play-off winners Maidstone United, who returned after two seasons of absence. Due to league expansion, there was only one relegation place this season. Walton Casuals finished bottom of the table, but were reprieved for the second time in four seasons.

League table

Top scorers

Play-offs

Semi-finals

Final

Results grid

Stadia and locations

League Cup

The Isthmian League Cup 2012–13 was the 39th season of the Isthmian League Cup, the cup competition of the whole Isthmian League.

Calendar

First round
Four clubs from divisions One participated in the First round, while all other clubs received a bye to the Second round.

Second round
The two clubs to have made it through the First round were entered into the draw with every other Isthmian League club, making sixty-four teams.

Third round

Fourth round

Quarterfinals

Semifinals

Final

See also
Isthmian League
2012–13 Northern Premier League
2012–13 Southern Football League

References

External links
Official website

Isthmian League seasons
7